CMR Surgical is a British medical device company based in Cambridge. It produces a robotic surgery system called Versius.  It was incorporated in 2014 and in 2018 employs over 1000 people. Previously called Cambridge Medical Robotics, it changed name in March 2018.

The company raised $100 million in June 2018, said to be Europe’s largest ever deal for a medical devices company, from investments by Cambridge Innovation Capital, the Zhejiang Silk Road Fund, Escala Capital Investments, LGT Group, and Watrium. This was hailed as the 'Venture financing deal of the year' at the Medtech Insight Awards.  The Chinese investment was seen as particularly significant.

The company plans to have its robots operating in more than six NHS hospitals over the next six months.  It is a rival of the established Da Vinci Surgical System and claims to be more flexible and versatile, having independent modular arms which are "quick and easy to set up". Some key patents for the da Vinci system have recently expired.

With headquarters at Cambridge Science Park and technology and research facilities at Evolution Business Park, the business also has a presence in Italy, Australia, New Zealand, Chile and Brazil.

In 2021 Macquarie University Hospital introduced the company's Versius robotics arm for keyhole surgery, following approval from the Therapeutic Goods Administration.  The 1,000 operation was performed by Professor Dr Raj Nagarkar, from HCG Manavata Cancer Centre, India in 2020. He said, “We are seeing clear patient benefits including reduced pain, and length of stay. Additionally, the open console means I can operate comfortably, helping to reduce physical tiredness from surgery. As far as the patient is concerned, obviously there is less pain, less bleeding and less risk of infection. I feel we need to elaborate on the advantages to the surgeon. Without being glued to the console, I could comfortably relax in a chair and operate. I have done six robotic-assisted procedures in one single day, without getting tired, myself.” The biomimic arm was introduced at Western General Hospital and Milton Keynes University Hospital in 2020. 

In 2022, the Versius robotic system was adopted for urological procedures in Pakistan and was also indicated for clinical use in thoracic. A successful trial in transthoracic esophagectomy was reported in Nature in October 2022.

References

Companies based in Cambridge
Medical technology companies of the United Kingdom
Medical device manufacturers